Khozaq (also Romanized as Khozāq and Khozzāq; also known as Khazagh and Qazzāq) is a village in Miyandasht Rural District, in the Central District of Kashan County, Isfahan Province, Iran. At the 2006 census, its population was 1,326, in 341 families.

References 

Populated places in Kashan County